Carira is a municipality located in the Brazilian state of Sergipe. Carira has a population density of 34 inhabitants per square kilometer.

References

Municipalities in Sergipe
Populated places established in 1953